Shard Bridge is a bridge in the English county of Lancashire. It spans the River Wyre, connecting Singleton, on the southern side of the river, to Hambleton, on its northern side (an area known locally as "Over Wyre"), carrying both automotive and pedestrian traffic of Shard Road (the A588). The word shard is a Roman term for "low crossing point on a river".A History of Blackpool, the Fylde and south Wyre, Nick Moore (2018), p. 21

The original bridge was built in 1864, and it went on to replace a ferry service between Stanah and Wardleys Creek further downstream to the west.

The first of two modern incarnations of the bridge was rebuilt in 1993, moving the structure a few yards downstream.

Formerly a toll bridge, Shard Bridge is now a free municipal crossing.

References

External links
 
The 1988 New Shard Bridge scheme by Lancashire County Council:
 Page 1
 Page 2
 Page 3
 Page 4

Bridges across the River Wyre
Buildings and structures in the Borough of Wyre
Buildings and structures in the Borough of Fylde
Bridges completed in 1864
Bridges completed in 1993
Former toll bridges in England
Singleton, Lancashire
Hambleton, Lancashire